Ella Rose Emhoff (born May 29, 1999) is an American model, artist, and fashion designer. As the daughter of U.S. Second Gentleman Doug Emhoff and stepdaughter of U.S. Vice President Kamala Harris, she is a member of the Second Family of the United States.

Early life 
Emhoff was born to Douglas Emhoff, an entertainment lawyer, and Kerstin Emhoff (née Mackin), a film producer. She was named after the jazz singer Ella Fitzgerald. Although her father is of Ashkenazi Jewish descent, a spokesperson for Emhoff clarified that Ella does not identify as Jewish. She has an older brother, Cole. Her parents divorced in 2008. In August 2014, her father married Kamala Harris, a lawyer who was then serving as the Attorney General of California. Emhoff and her brother coined the term "Momala" for their stepmother. Emhoff, whose family are members of the Democratic Party, was raised around politics. She and her family, as supporters of same-sex marriage in California, were active in fighting against the 2008 California Proposition 8. In 2016, her stepmother was elected to the United States Senate, representing California. In 2021, she became a member of the second family when her stepmother was sworn in as the Vice President of the United States.

Emhoff graduated from Wildwood School, where she was a member of the swimming and basketball teams, in 2018. She was a student at the Parsons School of Design in New York City, where she majored in fine arts with a concentrated focus in apparel and textiles, and she graduated in May 2021.

Career 
In 2014, Emhoff made a cameo in the music video for Bo Burnham's song "Repeat Stuff".

Emhoff designs jackets, hats, coats, and knitted shorts, which she sells from her Instagram account and her website. She also sells ceramics, paintings, and drawings from her website.

In January 2021, Emhoff was signed with IMG Models worldwide, an international modelling agency based in New York City. She has gained attention from the BBC and the New York Times for having tattoos and refusing to shave her armpit hair. The agency announced her contract on Twitter. Earlier, she was featured in an editorial for the independent fashion magazine Buffalo Zine. Viola, her modeling agent, signed her to his agency in September 2019.

She is a member of The 3% Movement, an organization focused on increasing the number of women creative directors in the United States.

Personal life and public image 

Emhoff lives in Bushwick, Brooklyn and has been called "The First Daughter of Bushwick". Her family has homes in Brentwood, Los Angeles; South of Market, San Francisco; and West End, Washington, D.C.

She is a supporter of LGBT rights, particularly as an advocate for the rights of transgender people. In 2020, she announced she would support the organization For the Gworls, a black, transgender-led collective that fundraises money to help black transgender people pay for rent, gender affirming surgery, travel, and medical care.

Emhoff spoke in the broadcast of the 2020 Democratic National Convention in August 2020.

On January 20, 2021, Emhoff attended the 59th U.S. Presidential Inauguration in Washington, D.C., where her stepmother was sworn in as the 49th Vice President of the United States , Emhoff is dating GQ editor Sam Hine.

Fashion 
Emhoff received international media attention at the inauguration due to her outfits, including a dress she co-designed with Batsheva Hay, and a jewel-encrusted Miu Miu coat. Vogue said that Emhoff's inauguration outfit "perfectly married her signature Brooklyn quirk with the solemnity of the occasion" and stated that "[Emhoff] wouldn't be hewing to any outdated notions of what a White House-adjacent young woman should dress like." After the inauguration, Emhoff's Instagram following increased from 50,000 followers to over 300,000 in less than a week. Fashion retailer Lyst reported that, after footage of Emhoff went viral on Twitter and TikTok, Miu Miu saw a 455% increase in internet searches six hours after the inauguration. She had also received attention for her skirt, tie, and Thom Browne coat she wore to the National COVID-19 Memorial in Washington, D.C., the night before the inauguration.

References

External links 
 

1999 births
Activists from Los Angeles
American fashion designers
American people of Jewish descent
American people of Swedish descent
American women fashion designers
Artists from Los Angeles
California Democrats
Children of vice presidents of the United States
Daughters of national leaders
Female models from California
Harris family
IMG Models models
American LGBT rights activists
Living people
Models from Los Angeles
Parsons School of Design alumni
People from Brentwood, Los Angeles